The anime television series We Never Learn is based on the manga series of the same name written and illustrated by Taishi Tsutsui. The adaptation was announced in the 39th issue of Weekly Shōnen Jump on August 27, 2018. The anime series was directed by Yoshiaki Iwasaki and written by Gō Zappa, featuring co-animation by Studio Silver and Arvo Animation and character designs by Masakatsu Sasaki. Masato Nakayama composed the music. The series aired from April 7 to June 30, 2019 on Tokyo MX, GTV, GYT, BS11, AT-X, MBS, and TV Aichi. Aniplex of America licensed the series for distribution under the title We Never Learn: BOKUBEN, and streamed the series on Crunchyroll, Hulu, and FunimationNow. In Australia and New Zealand, AnimeLab streamed the series in the region.

After the series' finale, a second season was announced, which aired from October 6 to December 29, 2019. The second season ran for 13 episodes. An OVA episode was bundled with the manga's fourteenth volume, which was released on November 1, 2019. Another OVA episode was bundled with the manga's sixteenth volume, which was released on April 3, 2020.

Episode list

Season 1

Season 2

Notes

References

We Never Learn